Supervillin is a protein that in humans is encoded by the SVIL gene.

Function 

This gene encodes a bipartite protein with distinct amino- and carboxy-terminal domains. The amino-terminus contains nuclear localization signals and the carboxy-terminus contains numerous consecutive sequences with extensive similarity to proteins in the gelsolin family of actin-binding proteins, which cap, nucleate, and/or sever actin filaments. The gene product is tightly associated with both actin filaments and plasma membranes, suggesting a role as a high-affinity link between the actin cytoskeleton and the membrane. Its function may include recruitment of actin and other cytoskeletal proteins into specialized structures at the plasma membrane and in the nuclei of growing cells. Two transcript variants encoding different isoforms of supervillin have been described.

Interactions 

SVIL has been shown to interact with Androgen receptor.

References

Further reading